Phenomenal Handclap Band  was formed in New York's East Village by producer Daniel Collás. Their first full-length record, Phenomenal Handclap Band, featured such diverse talents as Aurelio Valle, Carol C, Jaleel Bunton, Jon Spencer, and Lady Tigra. In 2011, Phenomenal Handclap Band toured the US and UK with Bryan Ferry. Their second full-length album, Form and Control, was released February 13th, 2012.

After a four year hiatus, the band released the single “Traveler’s Prayer” backed with “Stepped Into The Light” on their own Daptone Records imprint, Magnifreeq, in May 2017.  Their next release, “Judge Not”, in the autumn of 2018, would be their first release on Toy Tonics. They released three more singles over the next two years until their third studio album, PHB in May 2020.

Discography

Studio albums
Phenomenal Handclap Band (2009)
Remixes (2010)
Form and Control (2012)
PHB Loves NYC (2013)
PHB (2020)

Singles and EPs
"Baby" (2009)
"15 To 20" (2009)
"15 To 20/You'll Disappear" (2009)
"Testimony (Cosmodelica Mixes)" 10", Ltd. (2010)
"Anthony Mansfield Remixes" 12" (2010)
"Walk The Night" (w/Peaches) 12" (2011)
"The Right One" (2012)
"Unknown Faces At Father James Park" (2012)
"Shake" EP (2013)
"Traveler's Prayer" b/w "Stepped Into the Light" (2017)
"Judge Not" EP (Ray Mang Mixes) (2019)
"Jail" EP (w/ Waajeed and Marcel Vogel remixes) (2019)
”Remain Silent” EP (w/ Superpitcher and Ray Mang remixes) (2019)
”Do What You Like” (2020)

References

External links
  
 
 Phenomenal Handclap Band on Myspace
 Phenomenal Handclap Band on YouTube
 Phenomenal Handclap Band on Tummy Touch Records
 

Musical groups from New York City